Charles Gauci (born 1952) is an Australian priest who was appointed Bishop of the Roman Catholic Diocese of Darwin on 27 June 2018. He had been a priest in the Archdiocese of Adelaide since his ordination in 1977. His immediate previous post was as administrator of St Francis Xavier's Cathedral in Adelaide. He was consecrated bishop at St Mary's Star of the Sea Cathedral, Darwin on 26 September 2018.

Early life
Gauci was born in Malta and moved with his family to Australia when he was 13 years old. He was ordained in 1977 and served in several parishes in the Archdiocese of Adelaide, including the Southern Deanery with Kangaroo Island from 2012 to 2017.

References

External links

 	

Living people
Roman Catholic bishops of Darwin
1952 births